William "Bill"  Aspinall (birth unknown) is a former professional rugby league footballer who played in the 1960s and 1970s.

Testimonial match
Bill Aspinall's Testimonial match at Keighley took place in 1972.

References

External links
Search for "Aspinall" at rugbyleagueproject.org

Keighley Cougars players
Living people
English rugby league players
Place of birth missing (living people)
Rugby league locks
Year of birth missing (living people)